Mar Elias Monastery is a Greek Orthodox monastery in south Jerusalem, on a hill overlooking Bethlehem and Herodium, near .

History
According to Christian tradition, Elijah rested here after fleeing the vengeance of Jezebel. It is also said to be the burial place of the Greek Bishop Elias of Bethlehem who died in 1345, and St. Elias, an Egyptian monk who became Patriarch of Jerusalem in 494. Another Christian tradition is that Mary rested under the large hackberry tree growing north of the monastery when she was fleeing Herod, who had ordered the execution of all the children of Bethlehem.

From the hill east of the monastery, in 1956 one or rather several Jordanian soldiers opened fire on a group of Israeli archaeologists visiting the excavation sites across the valley at Ramat Rachel, killing four and injuring 16.

After 1967

During the 1967 Six-Day War, attackers of the Israel Defense Forces quickly overran Jordanian defences around the monastery on the way to Bethlehem and Hebron. After 1967 the height, known as Elijah Hill, was renamed in Hebrew as Givat ha'Arba'a, Hill of the Four, in honour of the four victims killed in the 1956 incident.

Facing the monastery is a stone bench erected by the wife of the painter William Holman Hunt, who painted some of his major works at this spot. The bench is inscribed with biblical verses in Hebrew, Greek, Arabic and English.

Since the 4th century, the monks of Mar Elias have cultivated olives and grapes.

Gallery

See also
 Christianity in Israel
 Jacob Pinkerfield, architect and archaeologist killed in 1956 by fire opened from Elijah's Hill

References

Bibliography

  (pp. 239−241)
 
  (p. 322)
  (pp. 30-31)
   (pp. 38− 39)
  (p.  18)
   pp. 224−226)
  (2nd appendix, p. 122)
 (p. 340)
  (p. 122)

External links
 Mar Elias Monastery, Bible walks
  Jonathan Lipnick, The First Church Dedicated Entirely To Mary, in Biblical Hebrew & Greek, 20 July 2016; about the Church of the Seat of Mary on the Jerusalem-Bethlehem road
 Survey of Western Palestine, Map 17:  IAA, Wikimedia commons

Greek Orthodox monasteries
Christian monasteries in Jerusalem